USS Partridge may refer to the following ships of the United States Navy:

, laid down 14 May 1918 by the Chester SB Co., Chester, Pennsylvania
, laid down as YMS-437 on 3 October 1944
, laid down as LCI(L)-1001 by Consolidated Steel Corp., Orange, Texas on 18 April 1944

United States Navy ship names